Ciutadella de Menorca or simply Ciutadella is a town and a municipality in the western end of Menorca, one of the Balearic Islands (Spain). It is one of the two primary cities in the island, along with Maó.

History

It was founded by the Carthaginians, and became the seat of a bishop in the 4th century. After being governed by the Moors under the names of Medīna el Jezīra and Medīna Menūrqa (مدينة منورقة) for several centuries, Ciutadella was recaptured during the reconquista by men serving Alfonso III and became part of the Crown of Aragon. During the Middle Ages, it became an important trading center.

On 9 July 1558, the Turks under Piyale Pasha and Turgut Reis with a powerful Turkish Armada of 140 ships and 15,000 soldiers, put the town under siege for eight days entered and decimated the town. The town was defended by only a few hundred men. All of Ciutadella's 3,099 inhabitants who survived the siege were taken as slaves to Turkey together with other inhabitants of surrounding villages. In total, 3,452 residents were sold into slavery in the slave markets of Istanbul (Constantinople), Turkey.

An obelisk was set up in the 19th century by Josep Quadrado in the Plaza d'es Born in memory of the offensive, with the following inscription:

Every year on July 9, a commemoration takes place in Ciutadella, remembering "l’Any de sa Desgràcia", or "the Year of the Disaster".

Geography and climate
Ciutadella de Menorca has a Hot-summer Mediterranean climate (Köppen: Csa) with mild, somewhat humid winters and dry, hot summers. Autumn is the wettest season and heavy rain is not rare during this season.

Religion
Despite no longer being Menorca's capital, Ciutadella has remained the island's religious center as the Bishop refused to move. The festival of Saint John, its patron saint, takes place each year on 23 and 24 of June. The Cathedral of Menorca, located in the old quarter of Ciutadella, was built in 1287 on the foundation of an older mosque.

Main sites

In the 17th century, many of Ciutadella's civil and religious buildings were built in the Italian style and gave it a historical and artistic unity.

Ciutadella's town hall is the former palace of the Arab governor and later served as a royal palace under the Crown of Aragon and again as a governor's palace until the British moved the capital to the eastern town of Mahon in 1722.

Punta Nati Lighthouse is located due north of Ciutadella.

Notable people
 Aina Moll Marquès (1930-2019), philologist and politician

Sister cities 

  Córdoba, Spain, Spain
 Oristano, Italy, since 1991
 Long Beach Island, New Jersey, United States, since 2012

Notes

Municipalities in Menorca
Populated places in Menorca